My Only One is a South Korean television series starring Choi Soo-jong, Uee, Lee Jang-woo, Yoon Jin-yi, Jung Eun-woo, Na Hye-mi, and Park Sung-hoon. The series aired on KBS2 every Saturday and Sunday from 19:55 to 21:15 (KST) from September 15, 2018, to March 17, 2019.

Plot
The drama begins with Kim Do-ran living with her foster parents. Her mother had passed away shortly after her birth and her father was jailed 28 years ago. Do-ran's foster father and her father were friends since childhood. After learning that his childhood friend had asked his landlady to put his daughter, Do-ran in an orphanage, he brought Do-ran home. Do-ran's foster father hid the truth about her father from her and his own family. He treated Do-ran very well and ensured she had a good education. Because of this, Do-ran was treated unfairly by her envious foster sister, Mi-ran, and her foster mother who never regarded her as her own daughter.

Despite such treatment, Do-ran did all she could to earn money for her foster family. During one of her part-time jobs, she had an incident with Dae-ryuk, the scion of the Wang family. Mi-ran wanted to study abroad and become a TV announcer. Do-ran's foster mom and Mi-ran were angry that the foster father wanted to send Do-ran abroad instead. Before he could do so, he died in an accident. His assets were inherited by the foster mother and the foster sister, and Do-ran was thrown out. Alone, she rented a simple apartment and sought employment.

At this time, a general amnesty was issued and Do-ran's father was released from prison. He found a job as a chauffeur with the Wang family. His childhood friend had faithfully sent him pictures of Do-ran's development through the years so he knew what she looked like and how she was doing. However, the letters and pictures suddenly stopped, weeks before his release. In the days that followed, he tried to find Do-ran and came to learn of his childhood friend's accident and death.

Do-ran landed a job as a secretary in Bom and Food Company owned by the Wang family after helping the Wang matriarch, Geum-byung who mistook her for her younger sister during her bout of dementia. Her foster mother who made some bad judgements in investment and was in trouble with loan sharks later sought shelter with her. On learning of the loanshark problem, Do-ran's father secretly helped them by asking for an advance on his chauffeur salary. Taking Do-ran's advice, her foster sister and foster mother later sought employment and were able to support themselves.

Do-ran's relationship with Dae-Ryuk who's the director of the company developed further. Eventually, they married but relations with Da-ya who married the younger Wang brother and Dae-ryuk's mother were strained. The truth that Do-ran's father was a convict and was responsible for Da-ya's father's death came to light one day. The couple was forced to divorce. However, Do-ran's father was later cleared of the murder and he was able to resume a normal life; running a bakery and getting married. Do-ran also severed relations with the Wang family and lived with her father and her foster family. Dae-ryuk still loved Do-ran and wanted to remarry her. The drama finally ended when they promised to remarry each other and walk towards the end

Cast

Main
 Choi Soo-jong as Kang Soo-il (formerly known as Kim Young-hoon): Do-ran's biological father  
 Lee Joon-seo as young Soo-il
 Uee as Kim Do-ran: Soo-il's daughter
 Kim Soo-in as young Do-ran
 Lee Jang-woo as Wang Dae-ryook
 Yoon Jin-yi as Jang Da-ya: Yi-ryook's girlfriend
 Jung Eun-woo as Wang Yi-ryook: Dae-ryook's younger brother 
 Na Hye-mi as Kim Mi-ran: Do-ran's adoptive younger sister
 Kang Joo-ha as young Mi-ran
 Park Sung-hoon as Jang Go-rae: Da-ya's older brother

Supporting
 Lee Doo-il as Kim Dong-chul: Do-ran's adoptive father
 Song Joon-hee as young Dong-chul
 Im Ye-jin as So Yang-ja: Do-ran's adoptive mother
 Jung Jae-soon as Park Geum-byung: Dae-ryook's grandmother
 Park Sang-won as Wang Jin-gook: Dae-ryook's father
 Ji Yun-woo as young Jin-gook
 Cha Hwa-yeon as Oh Eun-young: Dae-ryook's mother
 Lee Hye-sook as Na Hong-sil: Da-ya's mother
 Jin Kyung as Na Hong-joo: Da-ya's aunt
 Kim Chang-hoi as Secretary Hong
 Lee Seung-hyung as Chief Secretary Yang
 Kim Choo-wol as Yeo Joo-daek: Wang's family housekeeper
 Hwang Geum-byul as Miss Jo: Wang's family housekeeper
 Go Woo-ri as Jang So-young: JS Group President's daughter
 Im Ji-hyun as Yoo-jin: Do-ran's friend
 Lee Yong-yi as Geum-ok: Yoo-jin's grandmother
 Lee Sang-koo as Father Peter
 Park Hyun-jung as Yeon-yi : Do-ran's biological mother
 Park Ha-na as Sung Soo-hyun: Daughter of Q Pharmaceuticals
 Song Yong-shik as Park Dong-won: Soo-Il's friend
 Lee Sang-hoon as Byun Tae-suk: Hong-joo's ex-husband
 Lee Young-suk as Noh Sook-ja: Loan shark
 Kim Jung-heon as Seung-joon: Go-rae's friend
 Song Won-seok as Lee Tae-poong: Bakery employee
 Lee Joo-bin as Soo-jung: Yi-ryook's restaurant's employee
 Choi Dae-chul as Jang Dae Ho: Go Rae and Da Ya's father
 Kil Yong-woo
 Lee Hwi-hyang
 Na Yoon-hee
 Kang Sung-min
 Lee Joon-hyuk

Viewership

Awards and nominations

Notes

Adaptation

In 2021, this series was being adapted in Vietnam as Hương vị tình thân, aired on government-owned VTV1.

References

External links
 
 

Korean Broadcasting System television dramas
2018 South Korean television series debuts
2019 South Korean television series endings
Korean-language television shows